The Tallinn–Narva railway is a  long railway line in Estonia which runs through Northern Estonia between Estonia's capital city Tallinn and the city of Narva on the border with Russia.

The Russian Gauge railway line is double track between Tallinn and Tapa and single track between Tapa and Narva. It is the oldest railway in Estonia, and was opened in 1870 when a railway line connecting Saint Petersburg with Paldiski via Tallinn was opened. A significant part of the railway load consists of freight trains (such as oil trains) from Russia to the ports of Tallinn and its immediate vicinity (Muuga, Tallinn and Paldiski Harbor).

History
The railway line was completed in 1870 and was originally a part of the Baltic Railway line, which connected Saint Petersburg and Paldiski via Narva and Tallinn as a part of the railway network of the Russian Empire.

Services
Passenger services operate across the entire stretch of line with regional services operated by Elron to Narva railway station, Narva or Tartu railway station, Tartu and international services to Moscow and Saint Petersburg operated by GoRail.

References

Railway lines in Estonia
Transport in Tallinn
Railway lines opened in 1870